Herbert John Gough CB, MBE, FRS (26 April 1890 – 1 June 1965) was a British engineer and research director. He was most notable for his research on metal fatigue and was the chief engineer at Unilever from 1945–55.

Life
Born in Bermondsey, London, Gough attended the Regent Street Polytechnic, and won a scholarship to University College London. In 1909, he became an apprentice at Vickers, Sons in 1913. He graduated from the University of London, with a BSc, a DSc and PhD  in engineering. From 1914 to 1938, he worked at the National Physical Laboratory. From 1914 to May 1919, he served with the Royal Engineers. He was mentioned twice in dispatches, and was awarded the MBE in 1919.

His main area of expertise was the study of material fatigue. In 1938, he was director of scientific research at the Ministry of Supply. He was appointed Knight Commander of the Order of the Bath in 1942. He was responsible for the Telecommunications Research Establishment at Malvern, Porton Down, and the rocket station at Aberystwyth Port, Cardiganshire.

In 1946, he presented the Thomas Hawksley Lecturer on Unexploded ordnance. In 1947 he was decorated with the Medal of Freedom with Silver Palm by the United States.

After the war, he joined Unilever as Engineer-in-Chief. He retired in 1955. He was President of the IMechE in 1949.

Works
The fatigue of metals: with numerous diagrams and tables, Scott, Greenwood & Son, 1924

References

External links
"H.J. Gough", Google Scholar

1890 births
1965 deaths
People from Bermondsey
British Army personnel of World War I
British mechanical engineers
Fellows of the Royal Society
Royal Engineers officers
Members of the Order of the British Empire
Companions of the Order of the Bath
Alumni of the University of London
Scientists of the National Physical Laboratory (United Kingdom)